Shawn Katherine Holley is an American defense attorney.

Holley attended UCLA and Southwestern University School of Law.  She began her career in the Los Angeles public defender's office before being hired by Johnnie L. Cochran, Jr. She eventually became the Managing Partner of The Cochran Firm and was a member of O. J. Simpson's legal defense team, dubbed the "Dream Team."

She has represented a number of celebrity clients, including Kim Kardashian, Tupac Shakur, Snoop Dogg, Paris Hilton, Nicole Richie, Lindsay Lohan, and Trevor Bauer. She is currently a partner at the firm Kinsella Weitzman Iser Kump Holley, practicing in various areas of litigation.

Holley was chief legal correspondent for the E! Network, as well as an on-air legal analyst for KABC Eyewitness News in Los Angeles. She has appeared on the Today Show, Good Morning America, PrimeTime Live, Court TV, Fox News and CNN. Additionally Holley is a visiting faculty lecturer at Benjamin N. Cardozo Law School at Yeshiva University in New York City.

In the 2016 FX Miniseries The People v. O. J. Simpson, Holley was portrayed by Angel Parker.

Personal life
Her husband is musician Dorian Holley. They have three children Nayanna, Sasha and Olivia.

References

Living people
Place of birth missing (living people)
Year of birth missing (living people)
American lawyers